Irena Yebuah Tiran (born March 25, 1974) is a Slovenian mezzo-soprano opera singer of Ghanaian descent.

She graduated with honors from Mozarteum University of Salzburg  under prof. Ingrid Mayr (Ingrid Janser-Mayr) and completed post-graduate studies in lied and oratorio with prof. Wolfgang Holzmair. Her debut was in Ljubljana Opera House as Cherubino in Mozart's The Marriage of Figaro in 2000. She is a recipient of several awards.

She was on the jury panel of the first season of the Slovenian version of the Your Face Sounds Familiar show.

References

1974 births
Living people
Slovenian opera singers
Mozarteum University Salzburg alumni
21st-century Slovenian women singers